Eudes, French for Odo, may refer to:

Given name
 Odo the Great (died 735-740), Duke of Acquitaine
 Odo I, Count of Orléans (died 834)
 Odo I, Count of Troyes (died 871)
 Odo II, Count of Troyes, Count of Troyes from 877 to 879
 Odo I of Beauvais (died 881), Abbot of Corbie and Bishop of Beauvais
 Odo of France (c. 857-898), King of Western Francia
 Odo, Count of Toulouse (died 919)
 Odo I, Count of Blois (c. 950–996)
 Otto, Count of Vermandois (979–1045)
 Odo II, Count of Blois (983–1037) 
 Odo, Count of Penthièvre (c. 999–1079), also Count of Brittany
 Eudes, birth name of Pope Urban II (c. 1035–1099)
 Odo, Count of Champagne (c. 1040–1115)
 Odo I, Duke of Burgundy (1060–1102)
 Odo II of Beauvais (died 1144), Bishop of Beauvais
 Odo III of Beauvais (died 1148 or 1149), Bishop of Beauvais
 Odo II, Viscount of Porhoët (died 1170), second husband of Bertha, Duchess of Brittany, and her consort
 Odo of St Amand (1110–1180), Grand Master of the Knights Templar
 Eudes Archambaud, 12th century French noble, Lord of Sully
 Eudes de Sully (died 1208), Bishop of Paris
 Odo III, Duke of Burgundy (1166–1218)
 Eudes II, Lord of Ham (died 1234)
 Odo, Count of Nevers (1230–1266)
 Eudes de Lorris (died 1274), Bishop of Bayeux
 Odon de Pins (died 1296), Grand Master of the Knights Hospitaller
 Odo IV, Duke of Burgundy (1295–1349)
 Eudes Dagoulou (born 1990), Central African Republic footballer
 Eudes (footballer), Brazilian football midfielder Eudes Lacerda Medeiros (born 1955)

Surname
 Émile Eudes (1843–1888), French revolutionary and socialist
 John Eudes (1601–1680), founder of the Eudists, a religious order of the Roman Catholic Church
 Raymond Eudes (1912–1980), French Canadian lawyer and politician

Other
 Vitor Eudes (born 1998), Brazilian football goalkeeper

See also
 Eudo, a related given name
 Odo (disambiguation)